The Enemy (Italian: La Nemica) is a 1952 Italian melodrama film directed by Giorgio Bianchi and starring Elisa Cegani, Frank Latimore and Vira Silenti. It was shot at the Cinecittà Studios in Rome. The film's sets were designed by the art director Mario Chiari.

Cast
Elisa Cegani as Duchessa Anna
Frank Latimore as Roberto
Vira Silenti as Fiorenza
Jacques Verlier as Gastone
Carlo Ninchi as Monsignore
Ada Dondini as Nonna
Filippo Scelzo as Notario Ragaldi
Cosetta Greco as Marta
Sandro Franchina as Roberto bambino
Luigi Cimara as Lord John Lumb

References

Bibliography 
 Bayman, Louis. The Operatic and the Everyday in Postwar Italian Film Melodrama. Edinburgh University Press, 2014.

External links

 
 

1952 films
Films scored by Carlo Rustichelli
1950s Italian-language films
Italian drama films
1952 drama films
Melodrama films
Italian black-and-white films
1950s Italian films
Films shot at Cinecittà Studios
Films directed by Giorgio Bianchi